Storm Eleanor (known as Cyclone Burglind in Germany) was an extratropical cyclone and European windstorm that affected Ireland, the United Kingdom, France, Benelux, Germany, Austria and Switzerland on the 2–3 January 2018. The storm caused extensive damage and traffic disruption. It was given the name Eleanor by Met Éireann and the UK Met Office, while the Free University of Berlin named the low pressure Burglind.

Meteorological history
Eleanor developed to the west of Ireland as a secondary cyclone on 2 January to the parent low "Alja" to the southwest of Iceland, developing as a wave along the trailing cold front of the parent low. Before the low centre tracked across the North Sea to Denmark. To the south of the central low Eleanor caused strong winds which covered a large footprint of across much of western Europe.

The ECMWF operational forecast model of maximum winds featured a narrow corridor of strong winds crossing Ireland and Northern Ireland, which they suggested could be indicative of a Sting jet.

Impact

See also
2017–18 European windstorm season

References

European windstorms
January 2018 events in the United Kingdom
2018 in France
2018 in Austria
2018 in Germany
2018 in Switzerland